Mar William Jennings has been called "America's Top Lifestyle Expert". He is an American television host and actor. He is the host of Life On Mar’s: The Home Makeover Show, and is frequently featured guest on the Better Show with JD Roberto.
 
He has appeared on The Today Show, HGTV, and other television networks.

Career
Jennings is the creator and host of Life On Mar’s: The Home Makeover Show, an interior design and home improvement television show. The show is now in its fifth season and currently airs on Amazon Prime. It has been broadcast on ABC, and was recently syndicated on Cox, Comcast and various other American television networks, and has aired monthly on the Connecticut TV station WTNH. He was also the host of FOX 61/CT1 Media, Northeast Living, along with correspondent Elaine Irvin, which was nominated for a regional Emmy award.

In addition to founding S&J Multimedia and Mar Jennings Real Estate, Jennings has also worked at Christie's International Real Estate and Douglas Elliman Real Estate.

In 2014, Jennings became President & Sale Director at the real estate firm Mar Jennings Team at Higgins Group, an affiliate of Forbes Global Properties.

Books
 (A book that discusses six design principles for Jennings' Casual Luxury home design style.)

References

External links
Mar Jennings website

Living people
American television hosts
American interior designers
Christie's people